Lloyd Edwards was an Australian rugby league footballer who played in the 1900s and 1910s.  He played for Glebe and was a foundation player of the club. Edwards also spent two seasons playing for Balmain.

Playing career
Edwards made his first grade debut for Glebe in Round 1 1908 against Newcastle at Wentworth Park.

The match was the club's first ever game and also the opening week of the inaugural NSWRL competition.  Glebe won the game 8-5 with Edwards playing on the wing.

In 1909, Edwards joined local rivals Balmain and played 2 seasons with the club.

Edwards also represented New South Wales in 1909 playing in 1 game against Queensland during the interstate series.

References

Australian rugby league players
Balmain Tigers players
Glebe rugby league players
New South Wales rugby league team players
Rugby league players from Sydney
Rugby league wingers
Rugby league centres
Place of birth missing
Place of death missing
Year of birth missing
Year of death missing